Philip Anthony Giordano (born March 25, 1963) is the former Republican mayor of Waterbury, Connecticut, and a convicted sex offender. He was born in Caracas, Venezuela, to Italian parents and his family moved to the United States when he was two years old.

A lawyer, former state representative and former Marine (1981–1985), Giordano served three terms as mayor after being elected for the first time in 1995. In 2000, he unsuccessfully ran for a seat in the U.S. Senate, losing to Joe Lieberman.

Early life
Giordano was born in Caracas, Venezuela to Rocco and Olimpia Giordano. He has one older sister and one younger brother. He attended Holy Cross High School, however he wasn't able to graduate with his class in 1981 after getting caught smoking marijuana. He served in the United States Marine Corps from 1981 until 1985. He attended Naugatuck Valley Community College, before transferring to the University of Connecticut. He graduated with an undergraduate degree in political science in 1988.  Thereafter, he attended Western Michigan University Cooley Law School in Lansing, Michigan. After law school, he worked in the Waterbury corporation counsel's office until 1992.

Early political career
In 1993, there was a special election in the 71st district of the Connecticut House of Representatives. It occurered after the incumbent, Donald J. Davino, died in a car accident. Giordano lost the election to Davino's son, Robert. After he lost on election night, he had what one onlooker described as "a major meltdown". He ran for the position again the 1994 general election and won. He considered running for the United States House of Representatives against Congressman James H. Maloney in the 1998 election. He also considered running for Connecticut State Treasurer that same year.

Mayor of Waterbury, Connecticut
Giordano was elected mayor in 1995, defeating seven-term Democratic Mayor Edward "Mike" Bergin by 52% to 45%. He won reelection in 1997. He was reelected to a third term with 53% of the vote in 1999.

During his time as mayor, he claimed to have balanced Waterbury's budget, but prior to his arrest a state oversight board had to intervene as a result of chronic pension underfunding and taking money out of the pension fund to balance the general fund. On July 18, 2001, Giordano announced he would not seek a fourth term as Mayor. Upon Giordano's arrest in 2001, he was forced to step aside, leaving President of the Board of Aldermen Sam Caligiuri as acting mayor.

U.S. Senate race
In 2000, Senator Joe Lieberman was chosen by Democratic presidential nominee Al Gore to be his vice presidential running mate—and Lieberman also chose to run for a third term to the Senate (Connecticut law permits candidates running for both offices). Having little chance to defeat the very popular centrist Lieberman, few Connecticut Republicans wanted to take him on. Finally, the state GOP settled on Giordano. Lieberman focused on his vice presidential run and refused to show up at debates; Giordano, mostly ignored by the press, received some coverage by debating alone and mocking Lieberman. In the end, it mattered little, as voters returned the incumbent to the Senate by a nearly two-to-one margin (63% to 34%).

Convicted sex offender
While investigating municipal corruption, the FBI discovered phone records and pictures of Giordano with a prostitute, as well as with her 10-year-old niece and her eight-year-old daughter. He was arrested on July 26, 2001, During the trial, Giordano took the stand in his own defense. The Judge referred to his testimony as a disaster. In March 2003, he was convicted of 14 counts of using an interstate device, his cellphone, to arrange sexual contact with children. He was also convicted of violating the girls' civil rights. Judge Alan Harris Nevas sentenced Giordano to 37 years in prison. Shortly after his federal conviction, he returned to Waterbury to face state charges. He initially plead not guilty. In June 2004, a Superior Court judge refused to dismiss state sexual assault charges. In June 2007, he plead no contest to the state charges and was sentenced to 18 years in prison that ran concurrent to his federal sentence. In January 2004, Giordano filed an appeal on his federal conviction in the United States Court of Appeals for the Second Circuit. His conviction was upheld in March 2006. In July 2007 his motion to reduce this sentence was denied by a federal judge. In 2006, Giordano sued the city for back pay resulting from sick days and vacation time. In 2006, Giordano was assaulted by a fellow inmate at Garner Correctional Institution. In 2009, the victims were awarded $8 million each in compensatory damages by a federal judge. In 2015, Giordano petitioned for a writ of habeas corpus and certificate of appealability, claiming that his original trial attorney never conveyed the offer of a 15-year plea deal. After a hearing and finding evidence to the contrary, Connecticut District Court judge Stefan R. Underhill rejected Giordano's request. In January 2017, the United States Supreme Court refused to hear an appeal from Giordano. In November 2021, Giordano sought a reduction in his sentence. In August 2022, his request was rejected. In January 2023, Giordano filed an appeal against the judge’s denial for early release.  

Giordano is currently serving his original 37-year sentence at the Yazoo City Medium Security Federal Correctional Institution in Mississippi (inmate #14302-014) and is scheduled for release in 2033.

In a 2023 interview with the two victims, it was revealed that Giordano has never admitted to the molestation or apologized for his actions.

Personal life
Giordano married his wife, Dawn, in February 1994. They have three children. Dawn lives in Commack, New York on Long Island.

References

External links

http://www.nbc30.com/politics/2063329/detail.html
Mayor arrested on sexually related charges involving child
2000 campaign website

|-

|-

1963 births
American people convicted of child sexual abuse
American people of Italian descent
Connecticut politicians convicted of crimes
Corruption in the United States
Living people
Mayors of Waterbury, Connecticut
Republican Party members of the Connecticut House of Representatives
People from Caracas
American politicians convicted of sex offences
Prisoners and detainees of the United States federal government
United States Marines
Venezuelan emigrants to the United States
University of Connecticut alumni
Western Michigan University Cooley Law School alumni